The Six-Fifty is a lost 1923 American silent drama film directed by Nat Ross starring Renée Adorée. Based upon the 1921 play of the same name, it was produced then released by Universal Pictures.

Cast
Renée Adorée as Hester Taylor
Orville Caldwell as Dan Taylor
Bert Woodruff as Gramp
Gertrude Astor as Christine Palmer
Niles Welch as Mark Rutherford

See also
Gertrude Astor filmography

References

External links

1923 films
American silent feature films
Lost American films
Universal Pictures films
Films directed by Nat Ross
American films based on plays
American black-and-white films
Silent American drama films
1923 drama films
1923 lost films
Lost drama films
1920s American films